The common koels are three species of cuckoos. They have commonly been considered conspecific under the scientific name Eudynamys scolopaceus, but are increasingly treated as separate species:

 Asian koel, Eudynamys scolopaceus.
 Black-billed koel, Eudynamys melanorhynchus.
 Pacific koel, Eudynamys orientalis.
 Australian koel, Eudynamys (orientalis) cyanocephalus.

Birds by common name